Dooram Arike is a 1980 Indian Malayalam-language film, directed by Jeassy and produced by O. M. John. The film stars Sukumari, Srividya, Sankaradi and Sukumaran . The film has musical score and songs composed by Ilaiyaraaja.

Plot
Dooram Arike is an emotional family film of love and sacrifice.

Cast
M. G. Soman as Venu/Father Michael 
Sukumaran as James
Srividya as Gouri 
Ambika as Shirley
K. P. Ummer as Shirley's father
Sankaradi as Mani Iyyar
Sukumari as Alamelu
Bahadoor as Ramunni
Kuthiravattom Pappu as Varkey
Alummoodan aa Vasu
KPAC Lalitha as Santhamma
Suchitra as Elizabeth

Soundtrack
The music was composed by Ilaiyaraaja and the lyrics were written by O. N. V. Kurup.

References

External links
 

1980 films
1980s Malayalam-language films
Films scored by Ilaiyaraaja
Films with screenplays by Alleppey Sheriff